The Kirkus Prize is an American literary award conferred by the book review magazine Kirkus Reviews. Established in 2014, the Kirkus Prize bestows  annually. Three authors are awarded  each, divided into three categories: Fiction, Nonfiction, and Young Readers' Literature. It has been described as one of the most lucrative prizes in literature.

Eligibility and selection
Books reviewed by Kirkus Reviews that have received the Kirkus Star are automatically eligible for the Kirkus Prize and are selected for nomination. The eligibility dates of publication for books is typically between November 1 of the previous year and October 31 of the current year, with few exceptions. Self-published books that have earned the Kirkus Star are eligible for the Kirkus Prize. However, self-published books are not eligible based on their date of publication but rather the date of publication of their online review by Kirkus Reviews. All books must first be reviewed by Kirkus Reviews to be considered.

The Prize is divided into three categories: the Kirkus Prize for Fiction, the Kirkus Prize for Nonfiction and the Kirkus Prize for Young Readers' Literature. Each category is judged by a panel of three judges: a writer, a bookseller or librarian, and a Kirkus Reviews critic. The editors and staff of Kirkus Reviews evaluate each of the nominated books, conducting a first round of eliminations. The panels of judges then decide upon six finalists in each of the three categories. In the Young Readers' Literature category, the six finalists include two picture books, two middle-grade books and two teen books. The three winners are announced at a ceremony. The prize money for books with multiple authors and illustrators is divided fairly as decided by the Prize's judges and administrators.

Winners and finalists

Fiction

Nonfiction

Young Readers' Literature

See also 
List of American literary awards

References

 
American literary awards
Awards established in 2014
2014 establishments in the United States
American non-fiction literary awards
American fiction awards
American children's literary awards